FK Goce Delčev Skopje is a football club from Skopje, North Macedonia. They currently playing in the OFS Gazi Baba league.

History
The club was founded in 1958.

References

External links
Goce Delčev Skopje Facebook 
Club info at MacedonianFootball 
Football Federation of Macedonia 

Goce Delčev
Association football clubs established in 1958
1958 establishments in the Socialist Republic of Macedonia